Jayakody (ජයකොඩි) is a Sinhalese surname. Notable people with the surname include:

Marcelline Jayakody (1902–1998), Sri Lankan Catholic priest, musician, lyricist, author, journalist and patriot.
Edward Jayakody (born 1952), Sri Lankan musician, singer and composer.
Lakshman Jayakody (1930–2010), Sri Lankan Cabinet Minister.
Dhanushka Jayakody, Sri Lanka business consultant and executive.

Sinhalese surnames